Jorge Lasset dos Santos Costa (born 27 August 1986 in São Tomé), known as Lasset Costa, is São Toméan footballer who plays for Sporting Praia Cruz in São Tomé and Príncipe Championship as a defender. He was called to São Tomé and Príncipe national football team at the 2013 Africa Cup of Nations.

References

External links 
 
 

1986 births
Living people
People from São Tomé
São Tomé and Príncipe footballers
Association football defenders
São Tomé and Príncipe international footballers
Sporting Praia Cruz players